The Aaron Martin House is a historic house in Waltham, Massachusetts. The -story wood-frame house was built in the 1890s by Waltham Watch Company employee and real estate speculator Aaron Martin. It is a particularly well-preserved local example of Queen Anne styling. It has a variety of projections, gables, and porches, in a manner typical of the style, as well as a -story tower with a bell-shaped roof. Its porches are elaborately decorated with gingerbread woodwork.

The house was built in a Queen Anne style and was added to the National Register of Historic Places in 1989.

See also
Aaron Martin Houses
National Register of Historic Places listings in Waltham, Massachusetts

References

Houses on the National Register of Historic Places in Waltham, Massachusetts
Houses in Waltham, Massachusetts
Queen Anne architecture in Massachusetts